The Jasper–Prince Rupert train (formerly the Skeena and Panorama, now known as Trains 5/6, sometimes called The Rupert Rocket) is a Canadian passenger train service operated by Via Rail between Jasper, Alberta, Prince George and Prince Rupert in British Columbia.

Route history 
In 1911, with station names selected, passenger service was available for the first  eastward from Prince Rupert to Kitselas (formerly called Vanarsdol). Following the arrival of the tracks at Skeena Crossing in March 1912, the Grand Trunk Pacific Railway (GTPR) was offering passenger service from Prince Rupert to Hazelton with a ferry across the Skeena. By 1913, Rose Lake was a temporary terminal station location. In October 1913, the first passenger train arrived at Smithers.

In September 1912, an Alberta–Tête Jaune weekly passenger service began. In August 1913, the first GTPR passenger arrived at Kidd. From late 1913 to early 1914, immediately west of Dome Creek was a temporary terminal station location. Foley, Welch and Stewart (FW&S), the prime contractors, provided passenger and freight service on completed sections of the line as the railhead advanced. FW&S ran the first such westbound train into Prince George on January 30, 1914. In March 1914, GTPR passenger service coverage comprised Prince Rupert–Priestly, Prince George–McBride, and McBride–Edmonton (McBride being an overnight stop). However, the track conditions west of Hansard made the initial service unreliable. The Prince Rupert–Edmonton through service, which inaugurated that September, took 22–23 hours for Prince Rupert–Prince George, and the same for Prince George–Edmonton (about 11–13 hours for Prince George–Jasper). In following decades, the latter varied little, but the former decreased to 20–22 hours. With fewer stops, this is now about 12 hours and 7–9 hours respectively.

Maintaining services, Canadian National Railway (CNR) took over the insolvent GTPR. From 1922, a summer-month schedule operated until the end of each halibut season, because the passenger train also carried frozen fish as fast freight. Once regular passenger service ended in 1931, sleeping and dining cars were attached to the three-times-weekly way freight. In addition, from 1934 to 1942, a once or twice weekly summer passenger service operated with limited stops. When the US Army turned Prince Rupert into a major supply base in early 1942, four or five troop trains arrived daily, carrying 75,000 soldiers bound for Alaska. In 1943, the passenger service permanently expanded. With wartime demand ending, frequency reduced, despite protests, for the fish/passenger train, but was restored in 1951 to cater for new industrial developments at Prince Rupert and Kitimat. In 1954, new sleeper and passenger cars were introduced. A way freight ran on the Terrace–Kitimat branch line from January 1955, until replaced by a passenger service June 1955–November 1957.

In 1962, although Prince George–Jasper remained unchanged, Prince Rupert–Prince George frequency reduced, but restored during the 1965 summer and from the 1966 summer. In 1968, the whole route cut back, except for summer on Prince George–Jasper. Although CN experienced significant losses on the Prince Rupert–Jasper passenger service, an application to discontinue the route was denied in 1972, but CN became eligible for an 80 percent federal subsidy. Sustaining losses of $3.3m (on costs of $4.1m) in 1974 for the 25,000 passengers carried, CN's reapplication to discontinue was again denied. In 1977, Via Rail was launched as a CN subsidiary to gradually take over CN and CP passenger services. Via maintained the CN service levels, broadening the summer schedule to the whole route.

From 1981, the lower levels applied year round. Despite losses of $6.6m in 1988 for the 26,000 passengers carried, safeguarding isolated communities gave the route a reprieve from closure. However, the subsidy of $480 for every passenger carried made the route difficult to justify retaining, and alternatives remained under review.
 After extensive consultation, Via proposed an overnight stop in Prince George and a daylight schedule for the Prince Rupert leg that would enable tourists to enjoy the outstanding scenery. With ridership falling seven percent between 1990 and 1992, and a $9m deficit, the focus switched to possible service cuts and the daytime option was shelved in 1993. Eventually implemented in 1996, the daylight schedule also provided better connections with coastal ferry services and the BC Rail Cariboo Dayliner.

From the 1920s, CN promoted its "Triangle Tour". Rail tour operators such as Rocky Mountaineer have included the train or rails as part of various "circle" itineraries.

Present time

The train operates three times weekly, departing Jasper on Wednesday, Friday and Sunday. The return-service departs Prince Rupert on the same days of the week. The journey takes two days with an overnight stop at Prince George.

The train offers Economy Class, and twice a week in the summer, Touring Class service. Touring Class provides exclusive access to the Panoramic Dome car and the Park car. When Touring Class is available, Economy Class passengers are restricted from the dome cars; sandwiches, drinks, and other snack items are sold by the attendants at the passenger's seat. Touring Class passengers are served three meals per day in the Panoramic Dome car and staff provide commentary throughout the journey.

The train offers connections at Prince Rupert between the BC Ferries service to Port Hardy and Haida Gwaii, the Alaska Marine Highway service to points in southeast Alaska, and a connection at Jasper to the Via Rail Canadian to Vancouver and Toronto.

Patronage and subsidy 

A significant portion of the traffic on the train originates with a Jasper-based tour that offers a day-time package west to Dunster or east from McBride, with the opposite leg completed by bus.

Timetables

Scenery 
The departure from Jasper takes the train past Moose Lake, before traversing Mount Robson Provincial Park. The same was true above Bulkley Gate, near Hazelton. This section between Smithers and Terrace features mountain scenery, and the run east of Prince Rupert is beside the Skeena River.

Stations/stops

Footnotes

References 
  
 
 
 

	

Via Rail routes
Passenger rail transport in Alberta
Passenger rail transport in British Columbia
Night trains of Canada